Venus and Adonis may refer to:

Literary works
"Venus and Adonis", a story from Book X of Ovid's Metamorphoses
Venus and Adonis (Shakespeare poem)
Venus and Adonis (Constable poem), a poem by Henry Constable

Operas
Venus and Adonis (opera), an opera by John Blow
Vénus et Adonis, an opera by Henry Desmarest
Venus und Adonis, an opera by Hans Werner Henze

Paintings
 Venus and Adonis (Titian), of which there are versions from the 1520s onward
 Venus and Adonis (Veronese, Augsburg), 1562
 Venus and Adonis (Veronese, Madrid), 1580
 Venus and Adonis (Poussin), c. 1626
 Venus and Adonis (Rubens, 1614)
 Venus and Adonis (Rubens, 1635)

See also
 Adonis
 The Death of Adonis (Rubens)
 Venus (mythology)
 Venus, Adonis and Cupid, by Annibale Carracci, c. 1595